Mariana Espósito (born 10 October 1991), known professionally as Lali Espósito (or simply Lali), is an Argentine singer, actress, dancer and model.

Espósito began her career as an actress and singer in 2003 when she joined the cast of the children's telenovela Rincón de Luz, created by producer Cris Morena. She had other subsequent supporting roles in telenovelas Floricienta (2004–2005) and Chiquititas (2006), and a main role in Casi Ángeles (2007–2010), the latter of which increased her fame in Latin America, the Middle East, and Europe.

From 2007 to 2012, Espósito, along with four other cast members from Casi Ángeles, was part of the teen pop band Teen Angels, which originated from the series. The group was commercially successful internationally, and toured throughout Argentina and countries such as Israel, Spain, Italy and Latin America. Espósito also sang in the soundtracks of Rincón de Luz and Chiquititas. Following her role in the 2011 telenovela Cuando Me Sonreís and her portrayal of Abigail Williams in the Buenos Aires production of The Crucible, Espósito made her film debut in La Pelea de mi Vida in 2012, starring alongside Mariano Martínez and Federico Amador. She was part of the cast of the television comedy Solamente Vos (2013), portraying the daughter of Adrián Suar's character. In 2015, Espósito portrayed her first lead role on TV as the title character in Esperanza Mía. Its soundtrack album, in which she appeared on nine of the eleven tracks, received a platinum certification in Argentina for selling over 40,000 copies. For her portrayals in the crime-thriller film The Accused (2018) and Netflix's action crime drama television series Sky Rojo (2021), Espósito received critical acclaim.

Her debut solo studio album, A Bailar, was released on 21 March 2014, featuring pop and EDM influences.  "A Bailar" was released as the lead single of the homonymous album. The album spawned the singles "Asesina", "Mil Años Luz", "Del Otro Lado" and "Histeria". The album peaked at No. 5 in Argentina and at No. 3 in Uruguay. In 2016, she released her second studio album Soy after the previous release of the songs "Unico" and "Soy". Her third album, Brava was released in 2018, spawning the singles "Una Na", "Tu Novia", "100 Grados" (feat. A.CHAL), "Besarte Mucho", "Sin Querer Queriendo" (feat. Mau y Ricky), "Caliente" (feat. Pabllo Vittar) and "Somos Amantes". In 2020, Espósito released her fourth studio album, Libra. The album was preceded by the singles "Laligera", "Como Así" (feat. CNCO), "Lo Que Tengo Yo", "Fascinada" and "Ladrón" (feat. Cazzu). A Bailar and Soy were certified gold in Argentina by the Argentine Chamber of Phonograms and Videograms Producers (CAPIF), while Brava and Libra were certified platinum.

Espósito's accolades include Six Gardel Awards, Five MTV Europe Music Awards, one Kids' Choice Award, thirteen Argentine Kids' Choice Awards, Seven MTV Millennial Awards, one Heat Latin Music Award, one Martin Fierro Award, one Tato Award, and nominations for the Billboard Latin Music Awards, Premios Lo Nuestro, and the Seoul International Drama Awards. In 2015, Infobae named Espósito one of the 10 most influential women in Argentina.

Life and career

1991–2003: Early life and career: Rincón de Luz 
Mariana Espósito was born on 10 October 1991 in Buenos Aires to Carlos Espósito, a football coach, and Maria José Riera, who road-manages her tours. She has two older siblings, Ana Laura, a makeup artist and stylist, and Patricio Espósito, a former futsal player who played in Italy. Espósito lived in the Buenos Aires neighbourhood of Parque Patricios during her childhood and then moved to the district of Banfield, Buenos Aires. Espósito is of Italian descent through her great-grandparents.

Espósito made her television debut at the age of 6 on the children's program Caramelito y Vos in 1998, as a contestant impersonating Uruguayan actress and singer Natalia Oreiro. After wandering into a producer Cris Morena audition by mistake in early 2002, Espósito was cast in Morena's children television series Rincón de Luz, making her acting debut as part of the children's supporting cast, portraying Malena "Coco" Cabrera. Rincón de Luz ran on Argentina's Canal 9 and later América TV from 18 February 2003 to 18 December 2003. Espósito also made her singing debut in the Rincón de Luz soundtrack album, singing a duet with Agustín Sierra. Due to Rincón de Luzs success in Israel, Espósito was part of a stage adaptation at the Yad Eliyahu Arena in Tel Aviv, which ran for two weeks in April 2004.

2004–2006: Settlement as a child actress: Floricienta and Chiquititas 
In 2004, Espósito was cast as Roberta in the juvenile telenovela Floricienta, also created and produced by Cris Morena, which ran for two seasons on El Trece from 15 March 2004 to 2 December 2005. Floricienta was a record-smashing success in Argentina, Latin America, Israel and Europe, and has been broadcast in over 70 countries since its original run. The series helped to establish Espósito as a child actress of the likes of former Cris Morena Group stars Agustina Cherri, Marcela Klosterboer, Luisana Lopilato and Camila Bordonaba. Espósito was also part of the stage adaptation of Floricienta, ableit portraying different versions of her character, which ran for over 100 shows in 2004 and 2005 at Teatro Gran Rex, 10 shows at the Luna Park arena and 4 shows at the Vélez Sarfield Stadium, as well as a national tour in Argentina.

In 2006, Espósito led the children's cast in the remake of Cris Morena's highly successful children's series Chiquititas, released as Chiquititas Sin Fin, portraying Agustina Ross. Espósito also sang "Me Pasan Cosas" and "Por Una Sola Vez", two of the songs in the Chiquititas soundtrack album 24 Horas, which was one of the top ten selling albums in 2006 and participated in the stage adaptations in mid 2006 at Teatro Gran Rex.

2007–2010: Success with Casi Ángeles and Teen Angels 
In 2007, Espósito landed her first leading role on television, as Marianella "Mar" Rinaldi in Casi Ángeles (Almost Angels), also created by Morena and produced by Cris Morena Group. It became one of the most popular adolescent television programs in Argentina, Latin America and Israel. The series lasted from 2007 to 2010 and held high viewer ratings and earning four Martín Fierro Awards for Best Juvenile Program.

While acting in Casi Ángeles, Espósito became one of five members of successful pop band Teen Angels, signed to Sony BMG, along with Gastón Dalmau, Juan Pedro Lanzani, Nicolás Riera and María Eugenia Suárez. Teen Angels reached success in countries such as Argentina, Israel, Chile, Peru, Spain and Uruguay. Although Casi Ángeles ended in 2010, the band members announced they would continue working together, with Rochi Igarzábal replacing María Eugenia Suárez.

From 2007 to 2012, Teen Angels released six studio albums, of which five were certified platinum and one was certified gold by the Argentine Chamber of Phonograms and Videograms Producers. They were also spokespersons for numerous brands, such as Coca-Cola. The band won a Clarín Award, a Kids' Choice Award Argentina, two Los 40 Principales Awards, and a Quiero Award, and three nominations for Carlos Gardel Awards.

Teen Angels disbanded in 2012, and held its last concert on 11 October 2012 in Córdoba. Teen Angels, el adiós, a 3D concert film about Teen Angels, was released in 2013 and marked the end of the group.

2011–2013: Cuando me sonreis, The Crucible, Solamente vos and "A Bailar" 
After the end of Casi Ángeles, Espósito adopted her nickname Lali, by which she had been known to her friends and family, as her stage name.

In 2011, Espósito starred on Cuando me sonreís (When you smile at me), a new television series by Tomás Yankelevich, opposite Facundo Arana, Julieta Díaz and Benjamín Rojas. The following year, Espósito portrayed Abigail Williams in the Buenos Aires production of The Crucible by Arthur Miller, and made her film debut with La pelea de mi vida (The Fight of My Life), which also starred Mariano Martínez and Federico Amador.

Since January 2013, Espósito had starred the Pol-ka series Solamente vos (Only You), along with Adrián Suar and Natalia Oreiro, as Daniela, one of its leading characters.
In 2013, Espósito announced she would release her first album as a solo artist, titled A Bailar. When asked about the album's genre, she described it as mainly dance with hip hop influences. The album's lead single, "A Bailar", was released for digital download on her website on 5 August, causing the website to crash because of a spike in traffic. On 2 September, Espósito presented the music video for "A Bailar" at the prominent La Trastienda Club. "A Bailar" received 100,000 YouTube views on its release day, and the single entered the top 20 on iTunes Latin and iTunes Israel. It also was popular in music charts and radio channels in Latin America, Italy and Israel.

2014–2015: A Bailar, A los 40 and Esperanza mía 
Previous to the release of her debut album, Espósito released A Bailar EP, which included the tracks "A Bailar", "Asesina" and "Del Otro Lado". The music video for "Asesina", the second single, was uploaded to the singer's official YouTube account on 10 March 2014. The ten-track album A Bailar (English: Let's Dance) was released on 21 March 2014.

In support of the album, Espósito embarked on the A Bailar Tour of Argentina, with several later stops in Uruguay, Chile, Spain, Italy and Israel. The tour earned million in the first five shows at Teatro Opera Allianz and was later named the highest-grossing tour of 2015 in Argentina. Following the tour's success, more dates were added, and the tour concluded on 25 April 2016 at Menora Mivtachim Arena, Tel Aviv, after a total of 74 dates.

In May 2014 she starred in the Peruvian film "A los 40" (At 40), directed by Bruno Ascenzo. In the same year, she became the first ever Argentine artist to win a Kids' Choice Award in the United States for Best Latin Artist.

In later 2014, the singer signed an exclusive publishing contract with Sony Music Entertainment Argentina and released "Mil Años Luz" as the third single from A Bailar. To celebrate her incorporation to Sony Music, Espósito released a deluxe edition of A Bailar, which contained unpublished material including a new song, a remix, several video clips and a documentary of the tour. The album peaked at No. 3 in Uruguay and at No. 5 in Argentina, where it was certified gold a few days after its release.

In 2015, Espósito starred in the Pol-ka telenovela Esperanza mía (My lovely hope) alongside Mariano Martinez as Julia "Esperanza" Albarrazin, a young woman who settles in a convent by posing as a novice.

The A Bailar Tour, continued to 2016 across national cities like Buenos Aires, Rosario, Mar del Plata and Córdoba and included international stops in Uruguay, Italy, Spain and Israel. In 2014, the singer performed as the opening act for Ricky Martin show, held in Buenos Aires and in 2015 for Katy Perry's The Prismatic World Tour.

2016–2017: Soy, Permitidos and collaborations 

Espósito released her second studio album Soy on 20 May 2016, with El País newspaper writing that "she takes one more step with this album, she experiments, shows herself as she is, and that is always valuable". In an interview with Intrusos, the singer referred to the album's title (Soy, English: I Am) saying that "it is called Soy because I am sharing the truth about what I think and feel. It is super personal". It sold more than 20,000 copies in Argentina in just three hours, being certified gold by the Argentine Chamber of Phonograms and Videograms Producers (CAPIF). The album debuted at No. 1 in Argentina, Uruguay and Israel, and at No. 5 and No. 6 in Italy and Spain, respectively. Its lead single, "Soy", was released on 5 May and peaked at No. 5 on the Monitor Latino Argentina Top 20 chart and at No. 15 on the Ecuador Pop Songs chart. The second single, "Boomerang", was released on 5 September 2016. As of June 2017, its music video has been viewed more than 17 million times. Soy was listed as one of the best albums of 2016 by Billboard Brasil along with Beyoncé's Lemonade, Lady Gaga's Joanne, J Balvin's Energía and others. In the same year, Espósito was featured on Abraham Mateo's remix of the song "Mueve" from the re-issue of his album Are You Ready?, on Brian Cross song "Firestarter" from his second studio album Darkness to Life and on Baby K's Spanish version of the international hit "Roma-Bangkok".

In August, Espósito starred in the romantic comedy film Permitidos as Camila Boecchi alongside Martín Piroyansky. The film, which was directed by Ariel Winograd, grossed US$1.9 million and has been viewed more than 370,000 times. The review aggregator website Todas Las Críticas assigned the film a weighted average score of 67 out of 100, based on 42 critics, indicating "generally favorable reviews".

The singer embarked on the Soy Tour of Latin America, Europe and Asia on 8 September. Reviews of the tour performances generally praised Espósito's vocals and the show's staging, which is said that "fulfills the expectations of a nowadays international pop show."

Espósito's 2016 most notable accolades include Favorite Artist and Favorite Song for "Soy" at the 2016 Argentine Kids' Choice Awards, Best Latin America South Act at the 2016 MTV Europe Music Awards, Argentine Artist of the Year at the 2016 MTV Millennial Awards, and nominations for Best Actress at both the 2016 Seoul International Drama Awards and the 2016 Martín Fierro Awards, where she won Best Theme Song for "Tengo Esperanza". The singer became the first ever Argentine artist to enter the Billboard Social 50 and Artist 100 charts, peaking at No. 2 and No. 69, respectively.

In July and November, respectively, Espósito released "Una Na" and "Tu Novia" as the first two singles from her upcoming third studio album. The former one rapidly reached the top of the Argentine National Songs chart. In November, the singer kicked off her second concert tour in support of Soy, titled Lali en Vivo, with two sold-out shows at the Luna Park Arena.

In that period of time Lali was the most popular in the global ranking of different topics in multilingual Wikipedia.

2018–2019: Brava, The Accused and Talento FOX 
From January to July, the singer continued with her Lali en Vivo tour, which visited Peru, Spain, Italy, Israel and the United States. In February, Espósito was featured on Mau y Ricky and Karol G's remix of "Mi Mala", with Becky G and Leslie Grace, and, in May, she teamed up with CD9 and Ana Mena for the remix of "Prohibido". Preceded by the release of "100 Grados", in April, and "Besarte Mucho", in July, the singer released her third studio album, Brava, in August 2018. One week after, the album received a gold certification by the Argentine Chamber of Phonograms and Videograms Producers for having sold ten thousand copies. Espósito embarked on the Brava Tour immediately after the album release, on 23 August, with two sold-out shows at the Luna Park Arena. The album was succeeded by the release of the singles "Sin Querer Queriendo" with Mau y Ricky, and "Caliente", with Brazilian drag queen Pabllo Vittar. The singles peaked at number 14 and 51 on the Billboard Argentina Hot 100, respectively.

Outside of recording music, Espósito made her debut as a judge on Fox Latin America's original television talent show Talento FOX. In September, Espósito starred in the film The Accused, as Dolores Dreier, a girl accused of killing her best friend. The film was directed by Gonzalo Tobal and it made its premiere in the main competition of the 75th Venice International Film Festival.

Lali started off 2019 performing in Times Square, New York City, for Univision's Countdown Feliz 2019. Early that year, the music video for "Lindo Pero Bruto", her collaboration with Thalía, was released. The singer received notable nominations for the Premio Lo Nuestro and the Billboard Latin Music Awards. During the first months of the year, Lali continued touring with Brava, which was certified four times platinum in Argentina. For the 21st Annual Gardel Awards, Lali won three awards, the most of the night, in the categories for Best Female Pop Album and Best Cover Design for Brava, and Song of the Year for "Sin Querer Queriendo".

In the last months of 2019, Lali took her Brava Tour to Europe, the United States and the Rock in Rio music festival in Brazil, where she also received a gold certification for "Caliente." It was in these months that Lali officially kicked off her fourth music era: in October, she released her fourth studio album's lead single, "Laligera", which peaked at number 24 on the Billboard Argentina Hot 100; in November, she released "Como Así", which features boy band CNCO, with whom she co-hosted the 2019 Premios Juventud ceremony back in July.

2020–2021: Libra and Sky Rojo 
The year 2020 saw the release of Lali's fourth studio album titled Libra, which reached the number one position in Argentina. The album was preceded by the release of three more singles, namely "Lo Que Tengo Yo", "Fascinada" and "Ladrón" with Argentine trap singer Cazzu. 2020 was also marked by collaborations as Lali was featured in Los Ángeles Azules's "Las Maravillas de La Vida", Fito Páez's "Gente en la Calle" and the Dvicio-duet "Soy de Volar". Lali was also part of the charity single "Color Esperanza 2020" alongside Diego Torres, Thalía, Camilo, Carlos Vives, Manuel Turizo, Rauw Alejandro, Ivete Sangalo and others. The song was released as a joint effort by Sony Music Latin and Global Citizen to benefit the Pan American Health Organization's (PAHO) response to the COVID-19 pandemic.

2020 was also marked by the shooting of the upcoming Netflix series, Sky Rojo, for which Lali had to move indefinitely to Spain. Filming began in Madrid in November 2019, and, although the shooting of the series was originally planned to take place in approximately four months, the production of the series was forced to stop and was postponed due to the COVID-19 pandemic starting from March 2020. The pandemic caused the series to stop filming, which also delayed the release of Libra. Before a nation-wide lockdown was established in Argentina, Lali managed to return to the country and go through quarantine in her Buenos Aires house. In November 2020, Lali confessed that, like many of the Sky Rojo staff, she tested positive for COVID-19 between the months of June and November. Sky Rojo, which premiered in March 2021, saw Lali playing Wendy, one of three prostitutes that go on the run in search of freedom while being chased by their pimp and his henchmen.

In 2022, Lali starred and executive produced El fin del amor (The End of Love) on Prime Video.

Other work

Modelling 
Espósito has been a spokesperson for numerous brands, either independently or with her Teen Angels bandmates. Her first commercial was for the children's fashion label MCbody Jeans. In 2007, she signed an exclusive contract with the Argentine lingerie brand Promesse, and she has done most of her photo sessions with Luisana Lopilato. In 2009, Espósito and Peter Lanzani did a special promotion for KEFF body spray for the Israeli market. Between 2013 and 2014, she has been the spokesperson for the lingerie brand Lara Teens. In 2014 she starred in a commercial for hair conditioner Biokur in Uruguay and a commercial for feminine wipes company Carefree in Argentina.

In 2014 to 2016 she starred in commercials for Claro. Also from 2015 to 2017 she was an ambassador and star in commercials for the hair care brand Sedal, she would again be an ambassador and star in a commercial for the brand in 2021.  In 2018 she starred in commercials for Panacom and Terma. In 2019 she would stars commercial of Toyota and M&M´S, Espósito starred a commercial it would be one of the official faces for Garnier.
In October 2021 Espósito along with Bizarrap, L-Gante, Nicki Nicole and Duki starred in commercials for the beer brand, Brahma. In 2022, she starred a commercial for  Gancia.

Espósito has been the cover model for magazines such as Billboard, Galore, Vogue Latin America, Caras, OnMag, Las Rosas, Twees, Seventeen, Cosmopolitan, Luz, Viva, Watt, Nueva, Upss and Fack, among others.

Entrepreneurship 
On 21 September 2013, Espósito launched her own line of eponymous perfumes. In 2018, she launched a clothing collection with 47 Street.

Philanthropy 
In May 2010, Espósito and her Teen Angels bandmates participated in an action organized by the Biodiversity Foundation on the occasion of the World Biodiversity Day and raised awareness of the importance of preserving biodiversity.

Espósito has been named "Godmother" of Dono x Vos foundation, a nongovernmental organization dedicated to raising awareness about organ donation. In 2017, the singer joined forces with Red Solidaria and River Plate Football Club to launch a solidarity campaign named "Amor Es Presente". The campaign received donated toys that were later gifted to more than twelve-thousand children as part of Christmas festivities.

Activism 

Espósito is part of a feminist group of Argentine actresses and singers, such as Jimena Barón, Griselda Siciliani, Carla Peterson, Florencia Peña and Florencia de la V, among others. Espósito has declared herself in favor of the Voluntary Interruption of Pregnancy Bill in Argentina, where abortion was still illegal at the moment. The bill proposed that an abortion may be performed during the first 14 weeks of pregnancy, with no requirements other than the woman's desire. The bill was approved in 2020.

Public image 
In March 2014, the 23-year-old Espósito was ranked third sexiest Argentine woman in a survey reported by Radio Continental. That same year, she was ranked the 27th-most influential Spanish-speaking celebrity on Twitter.

Personal life 
Espósito's nickname and stage name, Lali, was originated by her eldest brother who mispronounced the short form of her name "Mari" as "Lali". She attended primary school and high school at the Colegio San Vicente De Paul in Parque Patricios.

Relationships 
From 2006 to 2010, Espósito was in an on-again, off-again relationship with her Chiquititas and Casi Ángeles co-star Peter Lanzani, whom she called her "first love". The couple is still a fan favourite in Argentina and they remained good friends after their breakup.

In 2010, Espósito began dating singer and actor Benjamín Amadeo after they met in Casi Ángeles. Espósito and Amadeo announced their breakup in 2015, but they and their families remained close friends, making several public appearances together.

From late 2015 to early 2016, Espósito was in a highly publicized relationship with her Esperanza Mía co-star Mariano Martinez. In 2017 Espósito began dating sound engineer Santiago Mocorrea; but they broke up in 2020.

Filmography

Film

Television

Theatre

Events, galas and others
 2017 - LVIII Festival Internacional de la Canción de Viña del Mar - Judge
 2022 - Premios Platino de 2022 - Presenter

Discography 

A Bailar (2014)
Soy (2016)
Brava (2018)
Libra (2020)

Concert tours 
Headlining
 A Bailar Tour (2014–16)
 Soy Tour (2016–2017)
 Lali en Vivo (2017–2018)
 Brava Tour (2018–2019)
 Disciplina Tour (2022–2023)

Opening act
 The Prismatic World Tour  (2015)
 The 7/27 Tour  (2016)
 One World Tour  (2016)
 Witness: The Tour  (2018)
 Never Be the Same Tour  (2018)

Awards and nominations 

As of September 2021, Espósito has won 51 awards from 115 nominations, including Six Gardel Awards, five MTV Europe Music Awards, one Kids' Choice Award, one Heat Latin Music Award, thirteen Argentine Kids' Choice Awards, six MTV Millennial Awards, one Heat Latin Music Award, one Martin Fierro Award, one Billboard Latin Music Awards and one Tato Award. Moreover, Lali has received nominations for the Premio Lo Nuestro, and the Seoul International Drama Awards, among others.

References

External links 

 
 
 

 
1991 births
21st-century Argentine actresses
Argentine child actresses
Argentine child singers
Argentine female models
Argentine pop singers
Argentine women singer-songwriters
Argentine stage actresses
Argentine telenovela actresses
Argentine television actresses
Argentine contraltos
Living people
Actresses from Buenos Aires
Singers from Buenos Aires
21st-century Argentine women singers
Feminist musicians
MTV Europe Music Award winners
Women in Latin music